Sukkur Division  is one of the seven administrative Divisions of the Sindh Province of Pakistan. This level of administration was abolished in 2000 but restored again on 11 July 2011.

Sukkur is the divisional headquarters of Sukkur Division, which comprises the following three districts:

The comprehensive Book on the History of Sukkur namely "سکھر تاریخ و تمدن" (Sukkur Tareekh Wa Tamaddun) is Written by Prof. Dr Abdul Waheed Indhar Published by Government of Sindh.

History 
On 1 April 1936 when Sind division separated from Bombay Presidency and established a Province.

On One Unit Policy Sind province merged into West Pakistan province on 30 September 1955 Create Khairpur Division when the State of Khairpur merged in Pakistan.

Pakistan Government merged the khairpur state into Sind province and gave the status of a district.

The Sukkur district was also include in khairpur Division. Later in 1975 when the Sind province was restored the divisional status was shifted from khairpur to Sukkur. khairpur remain a district of Sukkur Division.

Languages
At the time of the 2017 Census of Pakistan, the distribution of the population of Sukkur Division by first language was as follows:
 91.7% Sindhi
  3.5% Urdu
  2.0% Punjabi
  1.0% Saraiki
  0.6% Balochi
  0.4% Pashto
  0.3% Brahui
  0.2% Hindko
  0.0% Kashmiri
  0.2% Others

See also
Sukkur

References

Divisions of Sindh